Union Station was the main passenger railroad station of Troy, New York until it went out of service in 1958.  A Beaux-Arts building, designed by Reed & Stem and completed ca. 1903, it served the New York Central Railroad (NYC), the Boston and Maine Railroad (B&M) and the Delaware and Hudson Railroad (D&H). This was the fourth union station in Troy. The tracks approaching the station were but feet away from homes.

The New York Central use, by mid-20th Century, was mainly for conveying trains from the territory to other routes, carried by other companies. Thus, the D&H's Laurentian and Montreal Limited moved from NYC tracks to D&H tracks when leaving north from the station, toward their Montreal destination. Until 1953, the Rutland Railroad ran the Green Mountain Flyer and the Mount Royal from New York City, then moved at Troy onto B&M tracks, for eventual completion of their trip on Rutland Railroad track (also bound for Montreal).

The Boston & Maine ran the Minute Man from Troy Union Station to Boston's North Station. This train passed through the famed Hoosac Tunnel near North Adams and specialized in serving northwestern and north-central Massachusetts. The cutting of the Minute Man back to Greenfield, Massachusetts in January 1958 precipitated the closure of the station that year. The station was demolished later that year.

External links
Photograph of station, ca. 1905, Library of Congress collection
Vintage illustrations of the station, with map of the station's location in Troy; at Nashua City Station site
Growth of Railroads in the Capital District, including maps documenting Troy as a junction point between lines
Site with photographs of station and trains adjacent to station
Article from Railway Age (1901) with floor plan

Footnotes

Albany, New York
Albany, New York
Railway stations closed in 1958
Troy, New York
Former railway stations in New York (state)
Transportation in Rensselaer County, New York
Railway stations in Rensselaer County, New York